Just for Laughs UK is an adaptation of the Canadian series of the same name, that began in Montreal in late 2000. The hidden camera comedy show was broadcast on Saturday nights on BBC One. It was produced by Wild Rover Productions with Philip Morrow as producer. It started airing in 2003 and ran for five seasons, going off air in 2007.  During its run, it was the only Saturday night entertainment show currently on BBC One to be produced by an independent television company based outside London.

Just for Laughs was filmed primarily in and around Belfast, Northern Ireland, Glasgow, Scotland and Leeds, England.  The Belfast Botanic Gardens were a common filming location for doing some pranks.

Just for Laughs has a Canadian sister version called Just for Laughs: Gags, and the format of the two is identical. Some clips for Just for Laughs are taken directly from Just for Laughs Gags, and vice versa.

Repeat broadcasts
Since Just For Laughs ended on BBC One in 2007, the show was rarely repeated although Paramount Comedy 2 repeated the series at weekends for a short period in 2006, But it was not until 2009 when Channel 5's Sister Channel 5* (then called Fiver) bought the rights to repeat the episodes on weekday afternoons. Since the summer of 2010 the show has not been repeated on 5* and seemed highly unlikely to ever be repeated. However, from Monday 23 July 2012 the program was repeated on Comedy Central Extra for first time since 2006. The JustforlaughsTV YouTube channel has over 1 billion video views.

DVD releases
There have been several DVD releases of Just For Laughs which are below, each of these releases have been postponed

Just For Laughs Volume 1
Just For Laughs – The Best of Series One

References

External links
 
 
Youtube channel

Just for Laughs
2000s British comedy television series
2003 British television series debuts
2007 British television series endings
British television series based on non-British television series
BBC television comedy
Television shows from Northern Ireland
Television shows set in Glasgow
Television shows set in Leeds
Hidden camera television series
Television shows set in Northern Ireland
Television shows set in Belfast
2000s television series from Northern Ireland